Rabbi Avraham-Yehuda Goldrat (born 1912, died 17 June 1973) was an Israeli journalist and politician who served as a member of the first Knesset between 1949 and 1951.

Biography
Born in Kielce in the Russian Empire (today in Poland), Goldrat was certified as a rabbi following his studies. He served as secretary of the city's Young Agudath Israel branch, and worked as a journalist for the Der Vad newspaper in Warsaw. In 1933, he made aliyah to Mandatory Palestine. He became secretary of Poalei Agudat Yisrael, and also edited HaYesod, a weekly publication, and Sha'arim, a newspaper.

In the elections for the first Knesset in 1949, he won a seat on the United Religious Front list, an alliance of the four major religious parties. He lost his seat in the 1951 elections. In 1954, he left Poalei Agudat Yisrael, and later joined the National Religious Party, becoming a member of its directorate and head of its Culture and Information department.

In 1967, he became head of the Rambam Library in Tel Aviv, a position he held until 1973, the year in which he died.

He is the father of Eliyahu M. Goldratt.

External links
 

1912 births
1973 deaths
People from Kielce
People from Kielce Governorate
20th-century Polish rabbis
Polish emigrants to Mandatory Palestine
Jews in Mandatory Palestine
Haredi rabbis in Israel
Israeli librarians
Israeli journalists
Members of the 1st Knesset (1949–1951)
United Religious Front politicians
National Religious Party politicians
Agudat Yisrael politicians
Burials at Kiryat Shaul Cemetery
20th-century Polish journalists
Rabbinic members of the Knesset
Jewish Israeli politicians